In 2009 a number of prominent riders returned to professional cycling. Ivan Basso, Floyd Landis and Michele Scarponi had finished a suspension. Bjorn Leukemans was without a team for over a year due to doping-related allegations, which were proven to be ungrounded. Most notably, seven time Tour de France winner Lance Armstrong returned after a three-and-half year break, starting his season as a -rider in the Tour Down Under.

However, race organizer ASO did not invite the team for their races, and they did not participate in the Tour de France. Like another new ProContinental team,  from the Netherlands, Katusha and Cervélo immediately proved successful in the early months of the season.

This year's World Championships will be held in Mendrisio, Switzerland.

The UCI ProTour ranking, which was heavily devalued in 2008 due to the withdrawal from the ProTour by the three Grand Tour organizers, was replaced by the UCI World Ranking, based on a new World Calendar - effectively combining the existing 14 ProTour races with the Monuments and Grand Tours that are currently organized as "Historic" races.

World championships
The World Road championships were held in Mendrisio, Switzerland.

Grand Tours

UCI ProTour

Other World Calendar events
These races contribute, along with the Grand Tours and the UCI ProTour races, towards the 2009 UCI World Ranking

2.HC Category Races
The prefix 2 indicates that these events are stage races.

1.HC Category Races
The prefix 1 indicates that these events are one-day races.

National Championships
See 2009 national cycling championships.

See also
2009 in women's road cycling

 
Men's road cycling by year